Shannon Taylor may refer to:
 Shannon Taylor (attorney)
 Shannon Taylor (field hockey)

See also
 Shannan Taylor, Australian boxer